Gibson Jerome Haynes (born September 30, 1957) is an American musician, radio personality, painter, author and the lead singer of the band Butthole Surfers.

Early life and career
Born and raised in Dallas, Texas, Gibby Haynes is the son of actor Jerry Haynes, best known as Dallas-based children's TV host "Mr. Peppermint", and Doris Haynes. His uncle was Fred E. Haynes Jr., a decorated U.S. Marines Corps major general. Haynes attended Trinity University to study accounting. After graduating, he went to work as an auditor for the accounting firm Peat Marwick.

In 1981, Haynes and Trinity classmate Paul Leary published the magazine Strange V.D., which featured photos of abnormal medical ailments, coupled with fictitious, humorous explanations for the diseases. After being caught with one of these pictures at work, Haynes left the accounting firm and moved to Southern California along with Leary. After a brief period spent selling homemade clothes and linens emblazoned with Lee Harvey Oswald's image, the pair returned to San Antonio and launched the band that would eventually become Butthole Surfers, which was notorious for their elaborate stage shows and psychedelic music. Haynes would often fire a shotgun above the crowd during the Butthole Surfers live shows.

Haynes played saxophone on several albums, including the band's debut LP Psychic... Powerless... Another Man's Sac.

Haynes, along with Ministry frontman Al Jourgensen, lived with Timothy Leary, and were used as guinea pigs for his psychedelic experiments.

Haynes appeared with Ministry (recording the lead vocals on their song “Jesus Built My Hotrod”) and the 2006 Revolting Cocks CD entitled Cocked and Loaded.

Haynes has also fronted the band P with friend and actor Johnny Depp. He also did guest vocals for The Dead Milkmen and Deconstruction, Eric Avery's short-lived post-Jane's Addiction band. Haynes’ solo project is called Gibby Haynes and His Problem. In 2009 he produced Varshons, a record of cover songs by The Lemonheads featuring guest vocals from Liv Tyler and Kate Moss.  Gibby Haynes also appeared as a guest vocalist on the song "Atlanta" by Mastodon which was a limited edition release on 18 April 2015 to celebrate Record Store Day 2015. This song can also be found on Mastodon's 2020 album Medium Rarities.

Also a painter, in spring of 2011 Haynes exhibited some of his water colors and drawings at the Recess Activities space in the Kidd Yellin Gallery, located in Brooklyn, founded by Charlotte Kidd and Dustin Yellin.

Work in film and television
In the mid-1980s, Haynes and the band interspliced footage from a raucous Detroit concert with pontifications on consciousness, mostly while lying together in a large bed, in the concert video Blind Eye Sees All. Haynes and Johnny Depp produced a mini-documentary about John Frusciante's life called Stuff. In late 1992, Haynes appeared in GWAR's first long-form video, Phallus in Wonderland, as director Fritz Wang. Haynes appeared briefly in Jim Jarmusch's 1995 film Dead Man as a man being fellated in an alley. He also has a very small cameo appearance in Gregg Araki's 1997 film Nowhere and the Adult Swim television show Delocated. Additionally he appears as uncredited in CB4.

References

External links
A collection of Haynes' artwork as part of the Power Pathos  (2006) show at the Station Museum of Contemporary Art - Houston, TX
They Came from Hollywood

1957 births
American heavy metal singers
Butthole Surfers members
Living people
American male singers
Hardcore punk musicians
Noise rock musicians
Musicians from Dallas
Singers from Texas
Trinity University (Texas) alumni
Deconstruction (band) members